Jorgji Çako (1848–12 June 1934), also known as Gjergj Çako, was an Albanian lawyer and politician who served as Minister of Finances in the first provisional government of Ismail Qemali.

Life 
Jorgji Çako was born on 1848 in the village of Sheper, Zagori. There is very little information known about his life. He graduated from the Faculty of Law at the University of Athens and later immigrated to Istanbul where he served as a lawyer of a railway company. In 1912, he returned to Albania and settled in the coastal town of Vlorë. Shortly thereafter he became acquainted with Ismail Qemali and joined his newly formed provisional government as Minister of Finances, a post he held from 1913–1914. He also served as Deputy Minister of Finances from 1925–1928. Çako died in Vlorë on June 12, 1934.

References

1848 births
1934 deaths
19th-century Albanian lawyers
20th-century Albanian lawyers
20th-century Albanian politicians
Government ministers of Albania
Finance ministers of Albania
National and Kapodistrian University of Athens alumni
People from Libohovë